Hero Factory is an animated TV series based on the Lego toy series of the same name and produced by Threshold Animation Studios for The Lego Group and Geely. The series revolves around the Hero Factory, a crime-fighting organization that manufacture robotic heroes to fight and apprehend criminals across the galaxy and protect a similarly robotic populace. The main characters are a group of heroes that make up Team Alpha 1, the Hero Factory's most successful and praised team.

The series originally premiered as a four-part mini-series on September 20, 2010, on Nicktoons, further episodes followed as the theme continued as a toy line until its discontinuation in 2014.

Overview
Hero Factory revolves around the fictional organization of the same name that manufactures robots known as Heroes on a daily basis and train them to capture criminal villains and protect a similarly robotic populace, thereby maintaining order across the galaxy. Each Hero is unique, with their own distinct personalities and equipment, and are arranged into teams. Hero Factory's headquarters are based in a towering skyscraper centred in the fictional Makuhero City on a terraformed asteroid.

The series centers on the missions and Heroes of the Alpha 1 Team, the most praised and experienced team at the Hero Factory. Led by veteran Hero Preston Stormer, the team comprises senior members Dunkan Bulk and Jimi Stringer, original rookies and later fully fledged teammates William Furno, Mark Surge and Natalie Breez and new rookies Julius Nex, Nathan Evo and Daniel Rocka. All Heroes refer to each other by their last name.

From the episode "Ordeal of Fire" onward, the Heroes are upgraded into new "2.0" forms as part of a new Hero building system. The forms became the basis for subsequent upgrades; Heroes would be provided with new armor, weapons and gadgets for the mission at hand based on the environment they would have to enter or the lethalness of a villain.

Characters

Heroes

 Preston Stormer is the no-nonsense leader of Alpha 1, plagued by his failure in a past mission, and demanding in his expectations of all team members. A skilled Hero, Stormer has experienced hundreds of battles, and is a natural leader. He is very competitive, and specifically targeted the post of Alpha 1 leader because he believed he would excel in it. After the incident with Von Ness, Stormer is determined that no rookie would ever put a mission in jeopardy again and is especially harsh on them as a result; many prior rookies under his command either gave up or were transferred out. The incident also plagued him with feelings of guilt, and he often blames himself for things that go wrong with missions. Stormer is disinterested in popularity and believes that he should not receive praise for simply doing his job.
 William Furno was once a reckless and ambitious rookie Hero assigned to Alpha 1, now a valuable team member. As a rookie, Furno was impatient but passionate, and eager to prove himself, especially to team leader Stormer. He was also very overconfident, and believed he had the skill to succeed at any task. This amount of self-confidence forced him to push his own limits in order to succeed at harder tasks, even during his downtime. Time and missions have tempered his overconfidence, though he is still very eager. His attitude brought him into conflict with the similarly headstrong new rookie on the team Rocka, who was modeled after Furno himself, though Furno grew to accept the rookie. He had also attempted to cultivate leadership qualities, offering his tutelage to rookie Nathan Evo. He was eventually promoted to the rank of commander for Mission: Brain Attack, and put in charge of multiple Hero teams, including Alpha 1. His model, at the time of creation, was the newest and most up-to-date one available. His Hero Core is exceptionally pure, thought to be the purest in existence.
 Dunkan Bulk is a physically imposing, powerful senior Alpha 1 member, whose impressive strength belies a growing intelligence. Bulk's artificial intelligence is less developed than others, which he sometimes feels self-conscious about, but he makes up for this intelligence deficiency with sheer power. He is able to withstand blows that would destroy armored vehicles. He is reputed to be one of the Hero Factory's strongest active Heroes. Bulk is always ready for a mission, and enjoys fighting for the Hero Factory as much as he enjoys the actual fighting itself. He has been actively working to develop his intelligence, increasing his amount of reading and vocabulary.
 Jimi Stringer is a philosophical and musically inclined veteran of Alpha 1, who incorporates sound-based functions into his weaponry. Stringer enjoys fighting for the Hero Factory cause, but is very laid-back, and cool under pressure during missions. This attitude occasionally annoys his teammates, but helps him in dealing with the stressful situations they get into. Unlike the other members of the Alpha 1 Team, Stringer likes working with rookie Heroes. Stringer has a passion for music, and applies his casual, philosophical attitude about fighting toward lyric composition as well.
 Mark Surge is one of Team Alpha 1's youngest, a temperamental hot-head working to overcome a secret insecurity. Though he is convinced that something went wrong with his construction, Surge is nonetheless an able, if occasionally clumsy, Hero. Like his fellow rookie teammates, he was built with experimental designs, though Surge resented the constant examination this required. He is known to be defiant and emotional, often attempting to be rational, but is easily set off. He is also very strong, but his inexperience leads to an inability to use it properly all the time. He thoroughly enjoys going on action-oriented missions, rarely content to be involved with community affairs. Surge also struggles with fears that he is secretly evil and will become a villain, like Von Nebula. Although he has dealt with this fear directly over the course of his Hero career, Surge still deals with the insecurity, and often throws himself into action to compensate.
 Natalie Breez is the sole female member of Alpha 1. Brash in her dealings with her teammates, but with a connection to nature. Breez has a talent for remaining cool and collected under pressure. She cares deeply for innocent lives everywhere, but she frequently insists that she has no romantic interest in any of her teammates, and that their job as Heroes is what is most important to her. She is confident in her own ability and refuses to be protected by others. Diplomatic in nature, Breez is a fierce fighter when it comes to defending innocents, and will go out of her way to ensure citizen safety during missions. Breez has the ability to communicate with all known types of animals due to a program in her Hero Core, which also allows her to sense disturbances in nature. She is also skilled in knife and hook throwing, which featured prominently in her 2.0 training.
 Nathan Evo is an introspective rookie Hero working with the team, who emphasizes the use of heavy artillery in missions. Initially calm and quiet, Evo debuted as an expert at weaponry. During his initial missions, he would meditate before a fight to stimulate himself and sharpen his reflexes. As a rookie on the Alpha 1 team, he has faced pressures to live up to team leader Stormer, but with the assistance of his other teammates, he has been overcoming self-doubt and insecurity in order to be a worthwhile ally and Hero. Evo has lately developed an enthusiasm for all types technology, embracing the Battle Machines used in Antropolis City.
 Julius Nex is the socially nuanced and technologically gifted head of Hero Outreach and a rookie on Alpha 1, with a love for gadgetry. Nex is enthusiastic, highly skilled in the nuances of his body, has amazing flexibility, and hypersensitive senses. He is a communication expert, able to interface with nearly any system. For Mission: Savage Planet, he was programmed with instinct algorithms based on those of a saber-toothed tiger.
 Daniel Rocka is the headstrong new rookie of the team, also a member of the Hero Recon Team, a special covert division of Hero Factory. Rocka's outlook is very much like a younger Furno's; he is extremely self-assured and headstrong, willing to immediately take on a challenge without a thought to his own limitations. This confidence caused him to clash with Furno, but the two eventually settled their differences. His experience in the training sphere has given him a diverse skill-set. As a member of the Recon Team, he is also versed in secrecy and espionage teachings. Rocka specializes in technology, and excels in developing new software applications and devices.
 Von Ness is a cowardly rookie, who, participated in the incident of New Stellac City, which resulted in the original Alpha 1 team Captain Thresher, knocked out in the hands of a very traumatized Stormer. After the New Stellac incident, Von Ness’ signals and his clues of surviving a crack with a Hero-Craft(having a broken windshield) in space are dim.And obviously Stormer did not expect to meet Von in his evil form, Von Nebula.

Villains

 Von Nebula is an evil mastermind who mastered the manipulation of black holes through a technological staff he developed. He was once a hero himself named, Von Ness, but cowardly abandoned his teammate Stormer after a mission gone wrong. Descending down a warped path of villainy, he hired the most dangerous villains in the galaxy so that he can get his revenge on Stormer, blaming him for his own failures and insecurities as a hero. After a fight with Stormer and Furno he was defeated, and they trapped him inside his own black hole staff, placing it inside prison storage to keep it under watch. Ironically, Voltix used the black hole staff to cause a villain breakout, leading the Heroes to conclude that Von Nebula wanted the staff to be placed inside Hero Factory for some grander scheme, though his whereabouts are now unknown.
 XPlode is a villain who can fire explosives out of his armor. He and his partner, Rotor were hired by Von Nebula. They were stealing explosives from a Hero Factory transport, until the Heroes stopped them, while Rotor got captured he fled the scene. Later, he teamed up with Thunder, Corroder and Meltdown to destroy the Heroes, after the Heroes beat the villains, XPlode fired his explosives at the Heroes, but with a special device, the particle separator, they managed to survive his attack, then he got knocked out and he plus the other villains were arrested for their crimes. He was involved in the Breakout, but he was recaptured. XPlode is a coward, due to him leaving Rotor behind on their robberies.

 Thunder
 Corroder
 Meltdown
 Rotor
 Firelord
 Jetbug
 Nitroblast
 Drilldozer
 Witch Doctor
 Scorpio
 Rawjaw
 Waspix
 Fangz
 Black Phantom
 Voltix
 Speeda Demon
 SplitFace
 Toxic Reapa
 Jawblade
 Pyrox
 Scarox
 Bruizer
 Frost Beast
 Ogrum
 Aquagon
 Dragon Bolt

Recurring

 Professor Nathaniel Zib is a Senior Mission Manager at Hero Factory who overlooks all of the Alpha 1 team's ongoing missions. A skilled strategist and problem solver, which are traits necessary for his position as the chief mission manager, Zib holds a no-nonsense attitude while working and will willingly express mission protocols towards Heroes both on mission and in the Control Room.
 Quadal is Zib's assistant robot who aids him during Team Alpha 1's missions. He runs scans and completes technical work within the Control Room. Unlike most robots, Quadal is able to float and also withholds a set of extensive arms within his body. He does not communicate normally through speech, but via a series of beeping noises that Zib has been seen to understand. Quadal is able to easily make use of technology, and is also talented in the field of numeric sequencing.
 Akiyama Makuro is the founder and chairman of Hero Factory and Makuro Industries. Makuro is the oldest known robot in the galaxy. Recognizing the growing amount of evil in the universe, he created the Hero Factory; a corporation dedicated to creating Heroes to protect the galaxy. He personally oversees the creation of every Hero. At Stormer's creation, Makuro felt he was going to be a special Hero, and was correct as Stormer became leader of the Alpha 1 team. Seeing Furno's creation, Makuro sensed the same thing. Later, after a lengthy time working on the process, Makuro debuted the Upgrade, a new larger, stronger Hero design that he later rolled out to all Heroes.

Cast and characters overview

Episodes

Broadcast and release
The first four TV episodes aired continuously over four nights in September 2010, they were later released onto DVD as a singular film titled Hero Factory: Rise of the Rookies the following November 16. A fifth episode titled "Ordeal of Fire" debuted in April 2011, followed by two further episodes - the two part story Savage Planet - in September 2011 as a one-hour special. All three were released onto DVD on October 4, 2011, as Hero Factory: Savage Planet, with "Ordeal of Fire" added as a bonus feature. The broadcast format was repeated for the two-part story Breakout in April 2012.

The tenth episode "Brain Attack" premiered on the official Hero Factory website in March 2013, receiving a TV broadcast the following month on Nicktoons. A further episode titled "Invasion from Below" was produced by Lego with design partner Advance and animation company Ghost. Despite being produced by a different studio, the episode shares the same continuity as the rest of the series. The episode premiered as part of the online game of the same name in January 2014, and since Lego's decision to discontinue Hero Factory after 2014, is the last episode of the series.

Merchandise

Hero Factory (stylized as HERO FACTORY) is a line of toys by the LEGO Group marketed primarily at 6 to 16-year-olds. It was created in response to the decision to discontinue the Bionicle theme in early 2010.

Construction sets
The first Hero Factory sets were released on July 3, 2010, in the United Kingdom with the remaining five sets being released on July 4, 12, and 24. All original fifteen sets were released in the United States on July 24, 2010. Within the 15 sets released there are six hero characters, six villain characters, two vehicle, and a hero and villain limited edition set. The six hero sets are packaged in cylindrical canasters and contain around 17 to 19 pieces. The hero sets have an age rating of 6–16 and are around 15 cm (6") tall.
The villain sets are packaged in rectangular boxes and contain 40 to 50 pieces. The exception is the Von Nebula and Rotor sets which have 156 and 145 pieces respectively and are packaged in a larger box of the China. All the villain sets have an age rating of 7–16 and are around 17 cm (7") tall besides Von Nebula who is around 22 cm (9") tall and has an age rating of 9–16 and Rotor who is around 20 cm (8") and has an age rating of 8–16. The two vehicle sets are Furno Bike and Drop Ship. The Furno Bike set includes 165 pieces and has an age rating of 8–16. It contains a 30 cm (12") long motor bike and the hero character William Furno. The Drop Ship contains 390 pieces and has an age rating of 9–16. It contains a 43 cm (17") drop ship and a hero factory pilot. The Duncan Bulk and Vapour set contains 89 pieces and has an age rating of 8–16. It includes the hero Duncan Bulk, and the villain Vapour, with both figures being around 15 cm (6") tall.

In December 2010 ten new sets were released. The sets included six hero sets and four villain sets. The hero sets contain around 30 pieces, have an age rating of 6–16, and are around 17 cm (7") tall. The heroes sets are in rebuilt forms also known as 2.0 form and include Stormer 2.0, Furno 2.0, Breez 2.0, Surge 2.0, Evo 2.0 and Nex 2.0. The four villain sets form the Fire Villain storyline. Three of the villain sets - Drilldozer, Jetbug, and Nitroblast, contain around 60 pieces, have an age rating of 7–16, and are around 21 cm (8"). The exception is the set Fire Lord which contains 125 pieces, stands around 26 cm (10"), and has an age rating of 9–16.

References

External links

Lego television series
Lego themes
2010s toys
2010 American television series debuts
2010s American animated television miniseries
American children's animated action television series
American children's animated space adventure television series
American children's animated science fantasy television series
American children's animated superhero television series
American computer-animated television series
Animated television series about robots
Danish children's animated superhero television series
Danish children's animated action television series
Chinese children's animated action television series
Television series set on fictional planets
English-language television shows